"Do I Ever Cross Your Mind" is a song by American singer-songwriter Dolly Parton. The song was written by Parton and was first released as a duet with Chet Atkins on his 1976 album, The Best of Chet Atkins & Friends. Parton performed the song live throughout the 1970s, but did not release a solo version until 1982 on Heartbreak Express. Parton's solo version was released as the album's third single in July 1982, a double A-side release with "I Will Always Love You" from The Best Little Whorehouse in Texas soundtrack. The song did not chart on its own, but did chart as the flip-side of "I Will Always Love You" throughout the single's chart run on the Billboard Hot Country Songs chart. Parton would record the song for a third time in 1994, this time with Emmylou Harris and Linda Ronstadt. This version would be released on the 1999 album Trio II, and would be one of three singles released simultaneously from the album.

Chet Atkins version
Composed in the early 1970s (the song's copyright lists a 1973 date), Parton first recorded it as a duet with Chet Atkins, for Atkins' 1976 album The Best of Chet Atkins & Friends. The solo recording would become one of three tracks from Heartbreak Express to enter the top 10 in the country music singles chart.

"The Best of Chet Atkins & Friends" was published by RCA Victor under the catalogue number APL1-1985.
Heartbreak Express was published by RCA Victor under the catalogue number RCALP 3076.

Dolly Parton version

Beginning in the 1970s, RCA acknowledged Parton's twin appeal to pop- and country music audiences by packaging a number of her singles as double A-sides—pairing a mainstream commercial hit with a more traditional country number of roughly equal chart potential, with the A side released to pop radio, and the B side targeted toward country. Following this formula, RCA paired "Do I Ever Cross Your Mind" with another re-recorded single--"I Will Always Love You", from the Best Little Whorehouse in Texas soundtrack album —previously released on Parton's 1974 album Jolene.

Released on July 12, 1982, the double-A side was well-received. The single peaked at number one on the Billboard country singles chart on October 16, 1982, credited as "I Will Always Love You" / "Do I Ever Cross Your Mind".

Television
"Do I Ever Cross Your Mind" was performed by American Idol (Season 7) finalist Ramiele Malubay in 2008. She sang the song during the Dolly Parton tribute week.

The Chet Atkins version plays over the closing credits of "Women and God"—the third episode of the BBC comedy Bob Servant, Independent. The episode first aired on February 6, 2013, on BBC Four .

References

Dolly Parton songs
1982 songs
Songs written by Dolly Parton